The Young Americas Business Trust (YABT) is a non-profit organization established in 1999 as an outreach effort of the Organization of American States (OAS).

The YABT was founded to promote entrepreneurship for young people in the Americas by developing programs in the areas of leadership, training, technology, and strategic alliances.  YABT acts to create employment opportunities for young people for themselves and others through small businesses. YABT works with both government and private sector organizations in OAS Member States.

National Chapters

As of 2006, the following countries have chapters of the YABT:

Argentina                           
The Bahamas
Bolivia		
Brazil		
Colombia		
Costa Rica
Ecuador                            
El Salvador
Grenada                           
Guyana
Honduras
Mexico                              
Panama                        
Paraguay
Peru
Saint Kitts and Nevis
Uruguay

External links
 Young Americas Business Trust

References 

Business organizations based in North America
Organizations established in 1999
Organization of American States